The Lander College for Men is a private men's division of Touro University System located in Kew Gardens Hills, Queens, New York City. Its stated goal is to provide a college curriculum while maintaining a traditional Yeshiva environment. Generally, its attendees are students who have attended post-high school programs studying Talmud prior to their attendance, primarily in Israel.

Background and history
The Lander College for Men opened in the fall of 2000, and before long moved onto its  campus in Kew Gardens Hills. It graduated its first class in 2003. Geoffrey Alderman, who was a Vice President of Touro College, was Dean of the Lander College for Men from its inception, and served until the end of February 2002. He left to work at American InterContinental University in the UK. The current dean of the Lander College for Men, Dr. Moshe Sokol, succeeded him at that time.

In May 2012. Rabbi Abba Bronspigel retired from the position of Rosh HaYeshiva of Beis Medrash L'Talmud. He was succeeded by Rabbi Yonason Sacks and Rabbi Doniel Lander in the Fall of 2012.

In the biography of Rabbi Dr. Bernard Lander, it is stated that the Lander College for Men was created partially in response to dissatisfaction with the liberalization of Yeshiva University during the tenure of Rabbi Dr. Norman Lamm. In response to this, some of Yeshiva University's rabbinical faculty, specifically Rabbis Abba Bronspigel and Yehuda Parnes, decided to leave the school. With the assistance of Lander, they created a school with the goal of providing a more religious and more challenging Yeshiva environment than that of Yeshiva University.

Bernard Lander called the Lander College for Men the "flagship" of Touro College.

Academic environment 
This is a dual curriculum program involving college courses along with Judaic studies.  The vast majority of students in the school transfer from Israeli institutions focusing on post-high school full-time Judaic studies, where most have studied for multiple years. The school has a Yeshiva program, in conjunction with the associated Beis Medrash L'Talmud, for full-time Judaic studies for students who are either pre- or post-college. In accordance with school policy, all students are required to pray with the school's prayer services thrice daily. All students must also attend the morning program of Talmud studies, usually from 9:00am until 2:15pm, each Sunday through Thursday, with a break for lunch (the schedule varies by day). Following afternoon prayers at 2:20pm, academic classes start, Monday through Thursday, lasting until 7:00pm or so for most students. Night Seder (evening Judaic studies) from 8pm until 10pm is also officially mandatory, unless exempted by specific classes such as labs.

Notable alumni
 Daniel Rosenthal (born 1991), politician who has since 2017 represented the 27th District in the New York State Assembly and was the Assembly's youngest member when he took office.

Notable faculty
Yonason Sacks, Rosh Yeshiva

See also
 List of Jewish universities and colleges in the United States
Bar-Ilan University
Hebrew Theological College
Jerusalem College of Technology
Yeshiva University
Hareidi Judaism
Yehuda (Leo) Levi

References

External links
 Lander College

Private universities and colleges in New York City
Orthodox Judaism in New York City
Orthodox yeshivas in New York City
Orthodox Jewish universities and colleges
Educational institutions established in 2000
Universities and colleges in Queens, New York
Kew Gardens Hills, Queens
Jewish seminaries
Touro University System
Universities and colleges in New York City
2000 establishments in New York City
Jewish universities and colleges in the United States